Arthur Bull may refer to:
Arthur Bull (cricketer), English cricketer
Arthur Gilbert Bull (1890–1963), England rugby international player
Ted Bull (Arthur William Bull, 1898–1967), Australian Olympic rower